The first season of the American competitive reality television series MasterChef ran from July 27 to September 15, 2010 on Fox.

Whitney Miller was the winner of this inaugural season, with David Miller as the runner-up.

Top 14

Elimination table

 (WINNER) This cook won the competition.
 (RUNNER-UP) This cook finished in second place.
 (WIN) The cook won an individual challenge (Mystery Box Challenge, Elimination Test, or Pressure Test)
 (WIN) The cook was on the winning team in the Team Challenge and directly advanced to the next round.
 (HIGH) The cook was one of the top entries in an individual challenge, but didn't win.
 (IN) The cook wasn't selected as a top or bottom entry in an individual challenge.
 (IMM) The cook didn't have to compete in that round of the competition and was safe from elimination.
 (PT) The cook was on the losing team in the Team Challenge and competed in the Pressure Test.
 (LOW) The cook was one of the bottom entries in an individual challenge or Pressure Test, but advanced.
 (ELIM) The cook was eliminated from MasterChef.

Episodes

References

2010 American television seasons
MasterChef (American TV series)